There are two hills named Castle Hill within the immediate environs of Great Torrington in Devon, England. The first is within the town and is the site of the Norman & mediaeval castles, but was probably an Iron Age hill fort before this.

The second is a smaller Iron Age earthwork to the South East along the River Torridge which is probably also a small hill fort.

References

Hill forts in Devon
Great Torrington